The 1931–32 season was the first time Malmö FF competed in Allsvenskan. The club finished in ninth place and thus ensured another season in Sweden's top tier.

Players

Squad

|}

Competitions

Allsvenskan

League table

Matches

References
 

1931-32
Association football clubs 1931–32 season